Apis mellifera cypria (Cyprus honey bee) is a subspecies of the Western honey bee. Its habitat is the Mediterranean island of Cyprus.

Behaviour
The A. m. cypria has been reported to be a less swarmy bee when compared to other European honey bees.

In a 2008 study, the growth rate of colonies was observed to be lowest during the hottest month, while the most growth occurred during a month with temperature closer to the yearly average (or slightly above).

Defense
Papachristoforou et al found that in the presence of the predatory oriental hornet (Vespa orientalis) the bees initially generate an acoustic response, further reacting to eliminate the insect by asphyxiation.

Taxonomy
A separate subspecies from the other two Greek bee sub-species, the A. m. Macedonica and the A. m. Cecropia. DNA analysis found its mtD.N.A is more closely related to the A.m. Anatoliaca and the A. m. meda and belongs to the O Lineage (Oriental branch) of Apis mellifera.

References 

mellifera cypria
Western honey bee breeds